Joseph Fonclause (Claude Joseph 'le Mayeux' Fonclauze)  (1799–1862) was a French archetier/bow maker. 
Went to Paris to work for Lupot, Tourte and Vuillaume. 
From 1840 he worked alone. Most of his bows are stamped. 
Early in his career, he followed the Pajeot style. Nevertheless, later  followed a very different direction on the basis of what was soon to happen in Paris  (D. Peccatte's influence with the "hatchet-shaped" type head).

".....To our list of those affected by the Pajeot concept must also be added Claude Joseph Fonclause and Maire, as well as Nicolas Maline, who worked for Pajeot but who probably studied with Maire.  These three initially followed the Pajeot example, but later in their careers followed  very different directions on the basis of what was soon to happen in Paris (the Dominique Peccatte influence).  Even there, though, the Pajeot style had influence, and was in Mirecourt the dominant stylistic influence into the 1840s, surviving until another dramatic sea-change in the late 1850s."

".....one of the top mid-19th century French Master Bow Makers whose bows are highly sought after." -    Gennady Filimonov

References

 
 
 
 
 Dictionnaire Universel del Luthiers - Rene Vannes 1951,1972, 1985 (vol.3)
 Universal Dictionary of Violin & Bow Makers - William Henley 1970

1799 births
1862 deaths
Bow makers
19th-century French people
Luthiers from Paris